Craig of the Welsh Hills is a novel written by Roy Saunders in 1958.  It was first published in London by Oldbourne Press.  The novel follows the adventures of Craig, a champion border collie herding dog, who escapes into the Welsh hills following a car accident and becomes a sheep-killer and the efforts of his owner to recapture him.

References

1958 British novels
Novels set in Wales
Novels about dogs
Fictional dogs